Akademika Sofia was an ice hockey team in Sofia, Bulgaria. They folded in 2008.

History
The club was founded in 1949 as part of the Akademik Sofia sports club and existed until 1993 when they merged with CSKA Sofia. In 1995 the club was founded again and merged with Metallurg Pernik to form Akademik-Metallurg Sofia in 1998. They became independent again as Akademik Sofia in 1999. In 2001, they took on the name of Akademika Sofia. Akademika was Bulgarian champions in 2006 and 2007, and won the Bulgarian Cup in 1955, 1998, 2006, and 2007.

Achievements
Bulgarian champion
 2006, 2007 
 
Bulgarian runner-up
 1956, 1958, 1973, 1998 

Bulgarian Cup winner
 1955, 1998, 2006, 2007

External links
Akademika Sofia on eurohockey.net
Akademika Sofia on hockeyarenas.net

1949 establishments in Bulgaria
Bulgarian Hockey League teams
Ice hockey teams in Bulgaria
Sport in Sofia
Ice hockey clubs established in 1949